Drift Allstars Championship – is a professional drifting series that on average 50 drivers and teams, from at least 16 nations compete in a 10 stop Grand Prix series driving powerful and modified saloon cars. The Series was part of a hybrid investment and sponsorship deal in 2014 when from 2014 and until the end of 2015, it was backed  by Extreme and Alistair Gosling and his professional management team.

The 2014 Championship kicked off at the Olympic Park, London in May and finished in Athens, Greece in September. Video clip from London

For 2015 and beyond the new management team of Extreme and Niall Gunn  were working with new promoters around the world to bring the Drift Allstars brand to arenas, tracks, stadiums and city centers and have added music to the line-up with both bands and DJs being part of the offer.

Media Coverage
Based on the public interest social media is being used extensively to grow the brand and championship. The Facebook fan base is 1.44 million liking the brand, up from 171,000 in 2014.

TV - The 2014 8 x 30 minute part Drift Allstars TV show has been and is broadcast across 39 countries into 95 million household's on the following networks Pan Europe EXTREME TV, UK/Ireland – BT Sports, Bulgaria – BNT, Finland – MTV3, Italy – Fox Sports, Greece – Fox Sports, Cyprus – Fox Sports, Norway – Viasat, Sweden – Viasat, Lithuania – Viasat Baltics, Latvia – Viasat Baltics, Estonia – Viasat Baltics, Romania – Digi Sport, Russia – Auto Plus, UAE – OSN Network, Turkey – Fox Sports, USA – MAV TV, New Zealand – TV3, Asia – Eurosport Asia, Thailand – True Visions

History
It was Formerly and originally known as JDM Allstars when Niall Gunn formed it in 2008, with an inaugural structure of 3 events named the JDM Allstars TRIPLE Crown Series. These 3 lead events showcased at Teesside Autodrome, Lydden Hill Circuit and Europe's first street course at Wembley Stadium. Between early 2014 and to the end of 2015 Alistair Gosling and Extreme, who are backed by Kleinwort Benson Bank were supporting running and investing in Drift Allstars to take the brand to the next level.

Series champions

References

External links
WorldDriftGP website
Official website
JDM Allstars Pictures

Drifting series
Auto racing series in the United Kingdom
Awards established in 2008